Gong Hyun-joo (born January 7, 1984) is a South Korean actress.

Personal life 
Gong married a non-celebrity 1 year older than her in March 2019. In January 2023, Gong's agency announced that she is pregnant with the couple's first child and expected to give birth in July 2023.

Filmography

Television series

Web series

Film

Theater

Variety show

Music video

Advertisement

References

External links
 at Jellyfish Entertainment 

Jellyfish Entertainment artists
South Korean film actresses
South Korean television actresses
South Korean television personalities
Living people
1984 births
Actresses from Seoul
Dongduk Women's University alumni
21st-century South Korean actresses
Gong clan of Qufu